Olga Vladimirovna Volkova (born 15 April 1939 in Leningrad) is a Russian theatre and film actress. She began her career at the Bryantsev Youth Theatre in Leningrad. She appeared in more than ninety films since 1968.

Biography 
Olga Volkova was born in Leningrad (modern day - St. Petersburg), in a family of actors. In 1960 she graduated from the acting studio at the Leningrad Youth Theater (workshop of Leonid Makariev).

In 1970-1976, a meeting took place at the Leningrad Comedy Theater, after which Olga moved to the Bolshoi Drama Theater, where she worked until 1996.

Selected filmography

Awards
In 1993 Volkova received the People's Artist of Russia award. In 2002 won Golden Eagle Award for Best Supporting Actress for the film  The Tale of Fedot-Sagittarius (Baba Yaga).

References

External links

Soviet film actresses
Soviet stage actresses
Russian film actresses
Russian stage actresses
Russian television actresses
1939 births
Living people
People's Artists of Russia
Honored Artists of the RSFSR
20th-century Russian actresses
21st-century Russian actresses
Actresses from Saint Petersburg